The Streisand effect is the way in which attempts to hide, remove, or censor information can lead to the unintended consequence of increasing awareness of that information. It is named after American singer and actress Barbra Streisand, whose attempt to suppress the California Coastal Records Project's photograph of her cliff-top residence in Malibu, California, taken to document California coastal erosion, inadvertently drew greater attention to the photograph in 2003.

Attempts to suppress information are often made through cease-and-desist letters, but instead of being suppressed, the information receives extensive publicity, as well as media extensions such as videos and spoof songs, which can be mirrored on the Internet or distributed on file-sharing networks. In addition, seeking or obtaining an injunction to prohibit something from being published or remove something that is already published can lead to increased publicity of the published work.

The Streisand effect is an example of psychological reactance, wherein once people are aware that some information is being kept from them, they are significantly more motivated to access and spread that information.

History and etymology
In 2003, American singer and actress Barbra Streisand sued photographer Kenneth Adelman and Pictopia.com for US$50 million for violation of privacy. The lawsuit sought to remove "Image 3850", an aerial photograph in which Streisand's mansion was visible, from the publicly available California Coastal Records Project of 12,000 California coastline photographs, documenting coastal erosion and intended to influence government policymakers. The lawsuit was dismissed and Streisand was ordered to pay Adelman's $177,000 legal fees.

"Image 3850" had been downloaded only six times prior to Streisand's lawsuit; two of those being by Streisand's attorneys. Public awareness of the case led to more than 420,000 people visiting the site over the following month.

Two years later, Mike Masnick of Techdirt named the effect after the Streisand incident when writing about Marco Beach Ocean Resort's takedown notice to urinal.net (a site dedicated to photographs of urinals) over its use of the resort's name.

Knowledge in non-Western cultures
The phenomenon is well-known in Chinese culture, expressed by the  "wishing to cover, more conspicuous". A similar expression appeared as early as the 4th century BC.

Examples

In politics and government

In November 2007, Tunisia blocked access to YouTube and Dailymotion after material was posted depicting Tunisian political prisoners. Activists and their supporters then started to link the location of then-President Zine El Abidine Ben Ali's palace on Google Earth to videos about civil liberties in general. The Economist said this "turned a low-key human-rights story into a fashionable global campaign".

In May 2009, the Israeli political party Yisrael Beiteinu introduced a bill that would outlaw all commemorations of the exodus of Palestinians following the Independence War, known as "Nakba", with a three-year prison sentence for such acts of remembrance. The original bill did not pass, and the controversy surrounding it unintentionally promoted knowledge of the Nakba within Israeli society.

The French intelligence agency DCRI's attempt to delete the French Wikipedia article about the military radio station of Pierre-sur-Haute resulted in the restored article temporarily becoming the most-viewed page on the French Wikipedia.

A 2013 libel suit by Theodore Katsanevas against a Greek Wikipedia editor resulted in members of the project bringing the story to the attention of journalists.

In 2017, the government of South Africa stated their intention to ban the book The President's Keepers, detailing corruption within the government of then-President Jacob Zuma. This resulted in sales of the book skyrocketing dramatically, and it sold out within 24 hours before the ban was to be put into effect. This made the book a national best seller and led to multiple reprints.

In February 2018, Anne Applebaum wrote in The Washington Post about the Polish Holocaust law, which would have criminalized blaming Poles for the Holocaust. She argued that the Streisand effect would draw more attention to aspects of history that the Polish government preferred to suppress. The legislation is part of the historical policy of the Law and Justice party which seeks to present a narrative of ethnic Poles exclusively as victims and heroes. The law was met with widespread international criticism, as it was seen as an infringement on freedom of expression and on academic freedom, and as a barrier to open discussion on Polish collaborationism, in what has been described as "the biggest diplomatic crisis in [Poland's] recent history".

A 2018 study of millions of individual responses of Chinese social media users found that sudden censorship of information by the Chinese government and its affiliates often led to mass backlashes, including newfound popularity of VPNs and the subsequent reviewing of entire topic lists on which censored subjects appear. Other researchers found that the backlash tended to result in permanent changes to political attitudes and behaviors.

A 2019 study of political imprisonment by the government of Saudi Arabia found that while the incarceration tended to deter individual dissidents from further dissent, it strongly emboldened their social media followers, led to a sharp increase in calls for political reform, and resulted in an increase in online dissent and physical in-person protests overall, including criticism of the ruling family and calls for regime change. Such repression draws public attention to the imprisoned dissidents and their causes, and did not deter other prominent figures in Saudi Arabia from continuing to dissent online.

In March 2019, US Representative (Calif.) Devin Nunes filed a defamation lawsuit against Twitter and three users for US$250 million in damages. One user named in the lawsuit, the parody account @DevinCow (Name: Devin Nunes' cow), had 1,200 followers before the lawsuit. After the suit, however, @DevinCow had gained some 600,000 additional followers.

In August 2020, it was reported that the Chinese government had blanked out parts of Baidu's mapping platform, and that this could be used to find a network of buildings bearing hallmarks of prisons and internment camps.

In October 2020, the New York Post published emails from a laptop owned by Hunter Biden, the son of Democratic presidential nominee Joe Biden, detailing an alleged corruption scheme. Twitter blocked the story from their platform and locked the accounts of those who shared a link to the article, including the New York Post own Twitter account, and White House Press Secretary Kayleigh McEnany, among others. Researchers at MIT cited the increase of 5.5 thousand shares every 15 minutes to about 10 thousand shares shortly after Twitter censored the story, as evidence of the Streisand Effect nearly doubling the attention the story received.

In March 2022, incumbent Australian federal MP Tim Wilson, in what had previously been considered to be the safe seat of Goldstein, drew national attention to his independent challenger Zoe Daniel when he made legal objections to posting of campaign signs by volunteers on the fences of private residences. This also led to a significant increase in donations to the Daniel Campaign.

On 3 June 2022, Chinese streamer Li Jiaqi was interrupted for showing a tank-shaped ice cream in the livestream and failed to show up for the next scheduled show. This sudden suspension drew more attention to the sensitivity of the tank symbol, alluding to 1989 Tiananmen Square protests and massacre.

On June 18, 2022, The Times reported claims that Boris Johnson had tried to hire his now-wife Carrie Symonds as his chief of staff when he was foreign secretary. Although it was published on its first printed edition, it was then swiftly removed without explanation. It was also mentioned on MailOnline, who rewrote the Times' story in the early hours of the morning before also deleting its article without explanation or an editor's note. Rival newspaper The Guardian mentioned that this incident could backfire as an example of the Streisand effect. A few days later on June 21, 10 Downing Street said that the prime minister's special advisers asked The Times to retract the article, leading to questions about the objectivity of the editorship of the newspaper.

By businesses

In April 2007, a group of companies that used Advanced Access Content System (AACS) encryption issued cease-and-desist letters demanding that the system's 128-bit (16-byte) numerical key (represented in hexadecimal as ) be removed from several high-profile websites, including Digg. With the numerical key and some software, it was possible to decrypt the video content on HD-DVDs. This led to the key's proliferation across other sites and chat rooms in various formats, with one commentator describing it as having become "the most famous number on the Internet". Within a month, the key had been reprinted on over 280,000 pages, had been printed on T-shirts and tattoos, had been published as a book, and had appeared on YouTube in a song played over 45,000 times.

In September 2009, multi-national oil company Trafigura obtained a super-injunction to prevent The Guardian newspaper from reporting on an internal Trafigura investigation into the 2006 Ivory Coast toxic waste dump scandal. A super-injunction prevents reporting on even the existence of the injunction. Using parliamentary privilege, Labour MP Paul Farrelly referred to the super-injunction in a parliamentary question, and on October 12, 2009, The Guardian reported that it had been gagged from reporting on the parliamentary question, in violation of the 1689 Bill of Rights. Blogger Richard Wilson correctly identified the blocked question as referring to the Trafigura waste dump scandal, after which The Spectator suggested the same. Not long after, Trafigura began trending on Twitter, helped along by Stephen Fry's retweeting the story to his followers. Twitter users soon tracked down all details of the case, and by October 16, the super-injunction had been lifted and the report published.

In November 2012, Casey Movers, a Boston moving company, threatened to sue a woman in Hingham District Court for libel in response to a negative Yelp review. The woman's husband wrote a blog post about the situation, which was then picked up by Techdirt and Consumerist. By the end of the week, the company was reviewed by the Better Business Bureau, which later revoked its accreditation.

In December 2013, YouTube user ghostlyrich uploaded video proof that his Samsung Galaxy S4 battery had spontaneously caught fire. Samsung had demanded proof before honoring its warranty. Once Samsung learned of the YouTube video, it added additional conditions to its warranty, demanding ghostlyrich delete his YouTube video, promise not to upload similar material, officially absolve the company of all liability, waive his right to bring a lawsuit, and never make the terms of the agreement public. Samsung also demanded that a witness cosign the settlement proposal. When ghostlyrich shared Samsung's settlement proposal online, his original video drew 1.2 million views in one week.

In August 2014, it was reported that Union Street Guest House in Hudson, New York, had a policy that "there will be a $500 fine that will be deducted from your deposit for every negative review of USGH [Union Street Guest House] placed on any Internet site by anyone in your party and/or attending your wedding or event." The policy had been used in an attempt to suppress an unfavorable November 2013 Yelp review. Thousands of negative reviews of the policy were posted to Yelp and other review sites.

In September 2018, The Verge, an American technology news and media network operated by Vox Media, published an article titled "How to Build a Custom PC for Editing, Gaming or Coding" and uploaded a video to YouTube titled "How we Built a $2000 Custom Gaming PC", which was widely criticized for its instructions that would have been harmful or dangerous to both the computer and user if followed, and its numerous factual errors, such as claiming anti-vibration pads were for electrical insulation, and confusing zip ties with tweezers. In February 2019, Vox Media started issuing DMCA takedown notices to YouTube channels which posted content using clips from the video, most notably to technology channels Bitwit and ReviewTechUSA, bringing further attention to the video and the related content they attempted to suppress. After an outcry following the decision, YouTube reinstated these two videos, along with retracting the copyright "strikes" applied.

On 20 February 2020, Apple filed a legal complaint against the sales of the German-language book App Store Confidential, written by a former German App Store manager, Tom Sadowski. Apple cited confidential business information as the reason for requesting the sales ban. However, the publicity brought on by the media caused the book to reach number two on the Amazon bestseller list in Germany. The book was soon on its second print run.

In October 2020, the RIAA filed a DMCA takedown against the youtube-dl repository on GitHub, resulting in the repository and several forks being taken down. However, over 100 forks of the original repository appeared on GitHub in the days following the takedown request.

By other organizations

In January 2008, The Church of Scientology's attempts to get Internet websites to delete a video of Tom Cruise speaking about Scientology resulted in the creation of Project Chanology.

On December 5, 2008, the Internet Watch Foundation (IWF) added the English Wikipedia article about the 1976 Scorpions album Virgin Killer to a child pornography blacklist, considering the album's cover art "a potentially illegal indecent image of a child under the age of 18". The article quickly became one of the most popular pages on the site, and the publicity surrounding the IWF action resulted in the image being spread across other sites. The IWF was later reported on the BBC News website to have said "IWF's overriding objective is to minimise the availability of indecent images of children on the Internet, however, on this occasion our efforts have had the opposite effect". This effect was also noted by the IWF in its statement about the removal of the URL from the blacklist.

In June 2012, Argyll and Bute Council in Scotland banned a nine-year-old primary school pupil from updating her blog, NeverSeconds, with photos of lunchtime meals served in the school's canteen. The blog, which was already popular, started receiving a large number of views due to the international media furor that followed the ban. Within days, the council reversed its decision under immense public pressure and scrutiny. After the reversal of the ban, the blog became more popular than it was before.

In September 2022, after an upset loss to Appalachian State clips of Texas A&M's Midnight Yell Practice started trending on the internet, the clips featured quotes including "What's are the best 4 years of an Appalachian State Mountaineers life? The third grade!" along with "I know for a fact that half their football team can barely read the name of their jerseys, let alone read a map" Texas A&M filed several DMCA strikes on several platforms of the clips online, however with the clips being continually taken down and reuploaded, the clips became even more popular.

By individuals

In May 2011, Premier League footballer Ryan Giggs sued Twitter after a user revealed that Giggs was the subject of an anonymous privacy injunction (informally referred to as a "super-injunction") that prevented the publication of details regarding an alleged affair with model and former Big Brother contestant Imogen Thomas. A blogger for the Forbes website observed that the British media, which were banned from breaking the terms of the injunction, had mocked the footballer for not understanding the effect. Dan Sabbagh from The Guardian subsequently posted a graph detailing—without naming the player—the number of references to the player's name against time, showing a large spike following the news that the player was seeking legal action.

Similar situations involving super-injunctions in England and Wales have occurred, one involving Jeremy Clarkson. Since January 2016 a celebrity (later revealed outside England and Wales to be David Furnish) used the injunction granted in PJS v News Group Newspapers to prevent media in England and Wales reporting events that have been featured in Scottish media and on the Internet.

In 2018, Philippine Senate President Tito Sotto requested the Philippine Daily Inquirer to take down three of its online news articles published in 2014 that reported on the gang rape case of 15-year-old actress Pepsi Paloma in 1982. The articles stated that Sotto had intimidated Paloma to drop the case and used his political connections to influence the outcome of the rape case, of which his brother Vic Sotto was among the suspects involved. Tito Sotto alleged in his letter to the Inquirer that the articles "maliciously linked" him to the rape case and "negatively affected" his reputation "for the longest time". In response, links to the articles were mass-shared and archived into posts on Facebook and Twitter to preserve them and sparked renewed public interest into the Pepsi Paloma rape case. Eventually, a month after the request was made, the Inquirer complied with Sotto's request, with links to the former articles now redirecting to the Inquirer's home page.

A satirical play, Two Brothers and the Lions, was written by French playwright Hédi Tillette de Clermont-Tonnerre, about two wealthy British people who live in a castle on the Channel Island of Brecqhou, "who become cold, selfish monsters in the heart of our democratic societies". In reality the billionaire Barclay brothers, owners of the Daily Telegraph newspaper amongst other holdings, live in a castle on the island. David Barclay sued the playwright in France for defamation and invasion of privacy, though the Barclays were not named in the play. The playwright's lawyer described the play as "a satirical fable on capitalism". Tillette de Clermont-Tonnerre acknowledged that the play was partly inspired by the lives of the brothers. But he said it fell within his right to freedom of expression, and said the play had been commissioned to explore the issue of the continued existence of mediaeval Norman law in the Channel Islands, while ruminating on the nature and future of capitalism. In July 2019 Barclay lost the case. The play had been obscure and only played in small theatres, though critically acclaimed; after the lawsuit performances were scheduled in cities across France.

Luke O'Neill, an Irish immunologist writing in The Guardian, opined that Bret Stephens, an American Pulitzer Prize winning journalist, in 2019 achieved "as close to the perfect Streisand effect as one could imagine" by writing an email to David Karpf, an associate professor of media and public affairs, whose tweet calling Stephens a "bedbug" had attracted insignificant interest, saying "I'm often amazed about the things supposedly decent people are prepared to say about other people — people they've never met — on Twitter. I think you've set a new standard."; Stephens cc'd on the email the provost of George Washington University at which Karpf worked. Karpf retaliated against Stephens, by posting the email publicly on Twitter, and by writing an op-ed criticizing Stephens in the Los Angeles Times. Stephens was mocked on Twitter, deleted his Twitter account, and the story was picked up by media.

The Streisand effect has been observed in relation to the right to be forgotten, the right in some jurisdictions to have private information about a person removed from internet searches and other directories under some circumstances, as a litigant attempting to remove information from search engines risks the litigation itself being reported as valid, current news.

In 2019 author Andrew Seidel sent a copy of his book The Founding Myth: Why Christian Nationalism Is Un-American to conservative evangelical pastor Greg Locke in the hope of starting a conversation about the issues discussed in it. Locke said that he had no intention of reading the book, and burnt it, posting video of the burning on his social media accounts. Response to the video included many replies expressing the intention to purchase and read the book, and to donate copies to libraries.

In November 2022, TV host Pablo Motos took an offence in the wake of a Spanish Ministry of Equality TV promo that used an actor to play a male TV host asking a female guest about the kind of clothing he wore to sleep (echoing a similar situation involving Motos and actress Elsa Pataky in El Hormiguero), in order to denounce sexist attitudes women face on a daily basis. Motos invested 10 minutes of his show to criticise the promo and tell audiences that he is not machista (thus promoting, in prime time, an ad that presumably would have gone relatively unnoticed otherwise), Twitter users shared videos highlighting sexist attitudes by Motos in his show, Motos reportedly tried to take them down via copyright infringement notices from his production company, and they became viral.

In December 2022, Twitter CEO Elon Musk banned the Twitter account @elonjet, a bot that reported his private jet's movements based on public domain flight data. Musk had cited concerns about his personal safety, which have been largely discredited. The ban drew further media coverage and public attention to Musk’s comments on allowing free speech across the Twitter platform. Musk received further criticism after banning several journalists that had referred to the "ElonJet" account or been critical of Musk in the past.

See also

 
 
  (popularly known as a "D notice")
 
 
 
 
 
 
  ("Cobra effect")
 
 
 Royal Family (film)
 
 
 Super-injunctionsIn England and Wales, injunctions whose existence and details may not be legally reported, in addition to facts or allegations which may not be disclosed

References

External links

 "The perils of the Streisand effect". Parkinson, Justin. BBC News, July 31, 2014.

2003 in California
2005 neologisms
Adages
Barbra Streisand
Eponyms
Historical negationism
Internet censorship in the United States
Internet culture
Privacy controversies and disputes